Welcome to Pyongyang Animal Park is a 2001 North Korean film directed by Yoon Chan. Originally made as a two 60 minute episode television series(텔레비죤소설극), the film is a coming of age drama about a young woman, Eun-a(은아), who achieves her goals in spite of interference from her family.

Welcome to Pyongyang Animal Park was one of three North Korean films shown at the Special Screening section of the Jeonju International Film Festival, held from 28 April–6 May 2005.

References

External links
 film profile on the Jeonju international film festival website
 Link to an embedded video of South korean tv channel mbc reviewing the film Welcome to Pyongyang Animal Park in korean with footage from the film showcased
 Link to the South korean unification ministry's vhs storage catalogue that illustrates the location of the vhs in their centre
Entry of the film in North korean art and culture dictionary

2001 films
2000s Korean-language films
North Korean drama films
2000s North Korean television series